The Georgia Subdivision is a railroad line owned by CSX Transportation in the U.S. State of Georgia. The line runs from Harrisonville, Georgia, to Lithonia, Georgia, for a total of 145.9 miles. At its east end it continues west from the Atlanta Terminal Subdivision and at its west end it continues west as the Augusta Subdivision of the Florence Division.

See also
 List of CSX Transportation lines

References

CSX Transportation lines
Rail infrastructure in Georgia (U.S. state)